Allie Thunstrom (born April 20, 1988) is an American ice hockey forward for the Boston Pride in the Premier Hockey Federation (PHF). She currently holds the PHF record for goals scored in a single season. She has also played for the United States national team.

Playing career

High school 

At North St. Paul High School, she was the recipient of the 2006 Minnesota Ms. Hockey Award. She was named to the Associated Press All-State first-team in 2006. In addition, she was an All-Conference and All-State in soccer and softball in the state of Minnesota as well.

NCAA 

Thunstrom never missed a game while competing for Boston College. She appeared in all 141 games in her four years. In her senior season (2009–10), she recorded 22 goals and seven assists. Thunstrom led the Eagles in goals and points and finished the season with the most goals scored in Hockey East.

NWHL 

On August 1, 2018, Thunstrom signed a contract with the Whitecaps, which also signified her first player contract with the NWHL. She was selected to compete in the 4th NWHL All-Star Game for Team Stecklein in 2019 and the 5th NWHL All-Star Game for Team Dempsey in 2020. She won the fastest skater event at the 2020 skills challenge.

In the 2019–20 season, Thunstrom broke out with 36 points in 24 games, tied for second in the league with Whitecaps teammate Jonna Curtis and Boston Pride forward McKenna Brand. She became the first player in NWHL history to score 20 goals in a season. The Whitecaps made it to the Isobel Cup finals for the second year in a row, after Thunstrom scored the game-winning overtime goal against the Metropolitan Riveters in the semi-finals. The championship was ultimately cancelled due to the 2019-20 coronavirus pandemic.

International 

She won a silver medal at the 2010 Four Nations Cup contest in St. John's, Newfoundland.

Personal life 

In 2012, Thunstrom switched from hockey to speedskating in order to pursue her Olympic dreams. She competed in the 2014 and 2018 Olympic Trials, but missed out on the team. She also plays bandy.

She has listed former NHL player Pavel Bure as one of her favourite childhood players.

Career Statistics

Awards and honors
 2006 Minnesota Ms. Hockey Award
 2010 WHEA Second-Team All-Star
 2010 Frozen Four Skills Competition participant
 2019 Isobel Cup Champion
 2020 NWHL Most Valuable Player Award (shared with Jillian Dempsey)
 2020 NWHL Foundation Award

References

External links
 
  Boston College profile
 USA Hockey profile

1988 births
Living people
American women's ice hockey forwards
Boston College Eagles women's ice hockey players
Minnesota Ms. Hockey Award winners
Minnesota Whitecaps players
Isobel Cup champions
People from Maplewood, Minnesota
Ice hockey players from Minnesota
21st-century American women
Premier Hockey Federation players
Boston Pride players